Jaak de Wit (born 2 September 1932) is a Dutch football striker and later manager.

References

1932 births
Living people
Dutch footballers
PSV Eindhoven players
Eredivisie players
Association football forwards
Dutch football managers
FC Eindhoven managers
FC Dordrecht managers
Helmond Sport managers
Club Brugge KV head coaches
R.S.C. Anderlecht non-playing staff
Royal Antwerp F.C. managers
Dutch expatriate football managers
Expatriate football managers in Belgium
Dutch expatriate sportspeople in Belgium